During the 1973-74 season Juventus competed in Serie A, Coppa Italia, Intercontinental Cup and European Cup.

Summary 

During summer Giampiero Boniperti in his third season as Chairman transferred in Claudio Gentile future club legend and FIFA World Champion. Incumbent Champions in League, the team finishes the season with 41 points, only two points behind winners Lazio, first classified with 43.

Also in his third season as manager Čestmír Vycpálek saw the transfer out of Helmut Haller after five seasons as a starter in midfield, with the squad being eliminated early in European Cup by East German side Dynamo Dresden and losing the Intercontinental Cup against Independiente.

Meanwhile, in Coppa Italia the squad advanced to the second round losing the spot to the Final against Palermo F.C. in the last matches for Čestmír Vycpálek who left the club after three campaigns.

Squad

Transfers

Competitions

Serie A

League table

Results by round

Matches

Coppa Italia

First round- Group 1

Matches

Second round - Group B

Matches

European Cup

First round

Intercontinental Cup

Statistics

Players statistics

See also

References 

Juventus
Juventus F.C. seasons